Iron Maiden are a British heavy metal band.

Iron Maiden may also refer to:

 Iron maiden, a torture device

Arts, entertainment, and media

Fictional entities
 Iron Maiden (comics), a fictional Russian super villain from Marvel Comics
 Iron Maiden, a supervillain from the comic book T.H.U.N.D.E.R. Agents 
 Iron Maiden and Iron Maiden II, battleships from the anime series Trinity Blood 
 Eiserne Jungfrau, also known as "Iron Maidens" in English, characters of 07th Expansion Sound Novel Umineko no Naku Koro ni
 Iron Maiden Jeanne, a character in the anime and manga series Shaman King
 Valda the Iron Maiden, a comic book character

Music
 Iron Maiden (album), the band Iron Maiden's self-titled debut album and its title song
 "Iron Maiden", a song by Ghostface Killah from the album Ironman
 The Iron Maidens, U.S. all-female tribute band to Iron Maiden UK band

Video games 
 Neon Genesis Evangelion: Iron Maiden, a 1998 video game
 Neon Genesis Evangelion: Iron Maiden 2nd, a 2005 video game

Other uses in arts, entertainment, and media
 The Iron Maiden, a novel from the Bio of a Space Tyrant series by Piers Anthony
 The Iron Maiden, a 1962 British comedy film which was released in the U.S. as Swinging Maiden

Other uses 
 Iron Maiden, a nickname for a high entrance/exit turnstile
 Iron Maiden, nickname of the KC-135 Stratotanker, a U.S. Air Force mid-air refueling airplane
 Iron Maiden, a nickname for American professional female bodybuilder Iris Kyle

See also 
Iron Duke (disambiguation)
Iron Lady (disambiguation)
Iron Man (disambiguation)
Iron Woman (disambiguation)